Goulds is a designated place in the Canadian province of Newfoundland and Labrador. It is a rural neighbourhood within the City of St. John's southeast of the city centre.

History 
Goulds was an incorporated community up until 1991, at which time it was amalgamated with Wedgewood Park and Kilbride into the City of St. John's.

Geography 
Goulds is in the City of St. John's on the island of Newfoundland within Division No. 1.

Demographics 

Arts and culture 
The Goulds is known for having had two residents appear as contestants Canada's Worst Driver: Jillian Kieley (née Matthews) (in Season 11), and Ashley Dunne (in Season 13).

Transportation 
Some of the highways going through the Goulds include:
Main Road (Route 10); link to Kilbride and into downtown St. John's
Petty Harbour Road (Route 11); link to Petty Harbour-Maddox Cove, Cape Spear, and also into downtown St. John's
Robert E. Howlett Memorial Drive (Route 3); currently links to Mount Pearl (at Route 2, Pitts Memorial Drive) and will eventually link with new route known as Bifurcation Road

In addition, the Goulds is served by the Metrobus public transportation system, with service connecting with the neighbourhood of Killbride and The Village Shopping Centre.

Education 
The community has three schools: Goulds Elementary for grades K-5, St. Kevin's Junior High School for grades 6–8, and St. Kevin's High School for grades 9-12.

Notable people 

 Jillian Keiley, director

See also 
List of communities in Newfoundland and Labrador
List of designated places in Newfoundland and Labrador
Neighbourhoods in St. John's, Newfoundland and Labrador

References 

Designated places in Newfoundland and Labrador
Neighbourhoods in St. John's, Newfoundland and Labrador